Expo 2005 was a World Expo held for 185 days between Friday, March 25 and Sunday, September 25, 2005, in Aichi Prefecture, Japan, east of the city of Nagoya. Japan has also hosted Expo '70 Osaka (World Expo), Expo '75 Okinawa (Specialised Expo), Expo '85 Tsukuba (Specialised Expo), and Expo '90 Osaka (Horticultural Expo) and will host Expo 2025 Osaka (World Expo).

Theme
The theme of the Expo was "Nature's Wisdom", with national and corporate pavilions expressing themes of ecological co-existence, renewable technology, and the wonders of nature. In Japanese, this is rendered as Ai-chikyūhaku (愛・地球博), which means (roughly) "Love the Earth Expo," as well as being a play on the name of the host prefecture, 愛知 (Aichi).  According to the official website:
 We must come together and share our experience and wisdom, in order to create a new direction for humanity which is both sustainable and harmonious with nature.

Location
A smaller area of  nearby, accessible by gondola from the main site near Seto was also part of the Expo. Great care was taken to build the pavilions out of recycled or recyclable materials, to minimize environmental impact on the site, and to provide environmentally friendly transportation to and within the Expo area.

The cost of the Expo has been estimated at 340 billion yen ($3.3 billion). However, the recorded 22,049,544 visitors greatly exceeded the target of 15,000,000 and the Expo made a profit of over 10 billion yen.

The nearby city of Toyota also held some related events, although there was no special area set aside.

The area in Nagakute can be reached from Nagoya by subway (Higashiyama line) to the last stop in Fujigaoka, followed by a ride on the newly built Linimo magnetic levitation train.

Participants
121 Participants of countries set date for their own Pavilions. 

In regards to the companies & municipality, the ones who were present are as follows: 

Wonder circus - Federation of Electric Power Companies.
Central Japan Railway Company
Wonder wheel - Japan Automobile Manufacturers Association.
Mitsubishi
Toyota
Hitachi 
Mitsui&Toshiba
Mountain of Dreams - Chunichi Shimbun joint pavilion organizing committee.
Fire magic theater - The Japan Gas Association.
Japanese government
Aichi Prefecture
Earth Tower - City of Nagoya.
Chubu community for Millennial Symbiosis - Chubu regional exhibition executive committee.

Mascots

Morizo (モリゾー) and Kiccoro (キッコロ), collectively known as "Moricoro," (モリコロ) were created to be Aichi Banpaku's mascots. The popular fluffy green creatures are both from the forest of Seto.

Attractions
"Satsuki and Mei's House," was a recreation of the house from Hayao Miyazaki's movie My Neighbor Totoro, and located inside the “Forest Experience Zone”. It re-opened to the public on July 15, 2006. 
ASIMO, Honda's humanoid robot, was shown off at the Expo as one of its many public appearances.
The Toyota Partner Robots made their debut.
Chickens Suit a clothing range for chickens by Edgar Honetschläger made its debut with chickens on a runway.
The Growing Village Pavilion featured a variety of tree shaping art work.
The Franklin Spirit at the USA Pavilion, designed by award-winning experience designer Bob Rogers and the design team BRC Imagination Arts, presented the American statesman, Benjamin Franklin, using an innovative multi-plane 3D effect that suspended layered planes of digital media on stage, where Franklin visited the world of 2005 to celebrate his 300th birthday, as he discussed the pending advances in science, technology freedom and enterprise that will improve the lives of people worldwide.
The Forest Experience Zone contains three areas, the ‘Nature School Forest’, ‘Satsuki and Mei’s House’, and the ‘Japanese Garden’. This forest explores the relationship between people and nature.
The Street Art experience was performed in the park by multi artists, giants reproductions art exhibited open air. The French artist Gailord Bovrisse was one of them.

Theme songs
The official theme song of the Expo was "I'll Be Your Love," composed by Yoshiki, and performed by Dahlia, an Okinawan-American musician (then aged 24) from Honolulu, Hawaii. On March 24, 2005, Yoshiki conducted an orchestra and performed the song for the opening ceremony of the Expo. Pop singer Ayumi Hamasaki also performed a classical version of her single "A Song Is Born" on the event's opening day.

New transportation system
Linimo - magnetic levitation train using trains from Chubu HSST Development Corporation
Fuel Cell Hybrid Vehicle Bus (FCHV-Bus)
Intelligent Multimode Transit System (IMTS)

Holder
The holder was Japan Association for the 2005 World Exposition whose president was Shoichiro Toyoda, the honorary president of Toyota Motor Corporation.

See also
List of world expositions
Global Industrial and Social Progress Research Institute
Solar Ark
Chubu Centrair International Airport - Opened in accordance with the Aichi Expo.
Nagoya Pan-Pacific Peace Exposition 1937 
World Design Exhibition 1989

References

External links

Official website of the BIE
 European Patent Office
Expo 2005
Expo 2005 page at ExpoMuseum 
Japan Association for the 2005 World Exposition
Happy Jappy - Expo Memorial Park Info on current use of the park and a gallery of Expo 2005
Technology in harmony with nature... at a Japanese expo by Vinod Jacob 14 April 2006
Expo 2005 memorial park - the use of the site as of 2012

2005 in Japan
History of Nagoya
Tourist attractions in Aichi Prefecture
World's fairs in Nagoya
Nagakute, Aichi